Ary da Silva Graça Filho is a Brazilian former volleyball player and the current president of the Fédération Internationale de Volleyball (FIVB). 

He was a member of Brazil’s national team from 1963 to 1968. Before presidency of FIVB, Graça was President of the Confederación Sudamericana de Voleibol (CSV) from 2003 to 2012 and Brazilian Volleyball Confederation (CBV) from 1997 to 2012. During the 33rd FIVB world congress at Anaheim, USA on September 21, 2012, Graça elected as the fourth FIVB president. He is currently a member of the IOC Marketing Commission.

Graça holds a Bachelor's degree in Law, and speaks Portuguese natively, as well as English, French, Spanish and Italian.

In 2021, the Rio de Janeiro police said they are investigating Graça for tax fraud, money laundering and identity fraud.

References

1943 births
Living people
Brazilian sports executives and administrators